Mohammad Saif can refer to:

 Mohammad Saif (cricketer, born 1976), Indian cricketer who plays for Uttar Pradesh
 Mohammad Saif (cricketer, born 1996), Indian cricketer who plays for Railways